Taboo is a documentary television series that premiered in 2002 on the National Geographic Channel. The program is an educational look into "taboo" rituals and traditions practiced in some societies, yet forbidden and/or illegal in others.

Each hour-long episode details a specific topic, such as marriage or initiation rituals, and explores how such topics are viewed throughout the world. Taboo generally focuses on the most misunderstood, despised, or disagreed-upon activities, jobs, and roles.

Episodes
National Geographic TV producers did not produce Taboo in seasons of fixed episode counts, thus the number of episodes in each production batch varies wildly. The production order does not necessarily match the order episodes were arranged into for DVD "season" boxsets. In total, 118 episodes have aired.

Season 1
 "Food" - Sep. 30, 2002
 "Healers" - Oct. 7, 2002
 "Tattoo" - Oct. 14, 2002
 "Voodoo" - Oct. 21, 2002
 "Witchcraft" - Oct. 28, 2002
 "Marriage" - Nov. 4, 2002
 "Drugs" - Nov. 11, 2002
 "Evil Spirits" - Nov. 18, 2002
 "Sexuality" - Dec. 2, 2002
 "Death" - Dec. 9, 2002
 "Test of Faith" - Dec. 23, 2002
 "Blood Sports" - Dec. 29, 2002

"Death" is not featured on the National Geographic page for the show. However it does appear on the first season boxset.

Season 2
 "Justice" - Oct. 6, 2003
 "Delicacies" - Oct. 13, 2003
 "Creature Cures" - Oct. 20, 2003
 "After Death" - Nov. 3, 2003
 "Body Perfect" - Nov. 10, 2003
 "Sacred Pain"  Dec. 8, 2003
 "Rites of Passage" - Dec. 30, 2003
 "Child Rearing" - Jan. 12, 2004
 "Extreme Entertainers" - Jan. 19, 2004
 "Blood Bonds" - Jan. 26, 2004
 "Marks of Identity" - Mar. 15, 2004
 "Initiation" - Mar. 23, 2004

Season 3
 "Outcasts" - Jun. 14, 2004
 "Extreme Living" - Jun. 30, 2004
 "Spirit Worlds" - Jul. 07, 2004
 "Extreme Cuisine" - Jul. 14, 2004
 "Extreme Childhood" - Jul. 21, 2004
 "Body Cutters" - Jul. 28, 2004
 "Body Art" - Aug. 04, 2004
 "Gross Grub" - Sept. 13, 2004
 "Rites of Manhood" - Sept. 20, 2004
 "Possessed" - Oct. 4, 2004
 "Altered States" - Oct. 4, 2004
 "Gender Benders" - Oct. 18, 2004
 "Blood Rites" - Nov. 8, 2004
 "Crime Scene" - Jan. 27, 2005
 "Gross Work" - Jan. 27, 2005

Season 4
 "Initiation Rituals" - Aug. 5, 2007
 "Skin Deep" - Aug. 5, 2007
 "Sexual Identity" - Aug. 8, 2007
 "Signs of Identity" - Aug. 15, 2007
 "Proving Ground" - Aug. 22, 2007
 "Body Modification" - Aug. 29, 2007
 "Nudity" - Sept. 5, 2007
 "Trials of Faith" - Oct. 3, 2007
 "Pets" - Oct. 10, 2007
 "Gross Food" - Oct. 31, 2007
 "Extreme Performers" - Nov. 11, 2007
 "Jobs" - Nov. 14, 2007
 "Mating" - Nov. 21, 2007

Season 5
 "Touching Death" - Aug. 6, 2008
 "Extreme Kids" - Aug. 6, 2008
 "Supreme Devotion" - Aug. 13, 2008
 "Body Extremes" - Aug. 20, 2008
 "Extreme Healing" - Aug. 27, 2008
 "Trial by Fire" - Sept. 3, 2008
 "Extreme Eats" - Sept. 10, 2008
 "Outsiders" - Sept. 17, 2008
 "Drugs" - Oct. 15, 2008
 "The Third Sex" - Oct. 22, 2008
 "Extreme Punishment" - Oct. 29, 2008
 "Bizarre Bodies" - Nov. 10, 2008
 "Extreme Rituals" - Nov. 24, 2008
 "Spilling Blood" - Dec. 1, 2008
 "Sex" - Dec. 8, 2008

Season 6
 "Prostitution" - Jan. 17, 2010
 "Fat" - Jan. 20, 2010
 "Misfits" - Jan. 27, 2010
 "Narcotics" - Feb. 3, 2010
 "Strange Love" - Feb. 10, 2010
 "Beyond the Grave" - Feb. 17, 2010

Season 7
 "Beauty" - May 2, 2011
 "Fantasy Lives" - May 2, 2011
 "Addiction" - May 9, 2011
 "Hoarders" - May 16, 2011
 "Prison Love" - May 23, 2011
 "Forbidden Love" - Jun. 12, 2011

Season 8
 "Secret Lives" - Jan. 3, 2012
 "Odd Couples" - Jan. 10, 2012
 "Extreme Fighting" - Jan. 17, 2012
 "Freaky Remedies" - Jan. 24, 2012

Season 9
 "Living With the Dead" - Jun. 17, 2012
 "Strange Behavior" - Jun. 24, 2012
 "Booze" - Jul. 1, 2012
 "Teen Sex" - Jul. 8, 2012
 "Extreme Collectors" - Jul. 15, 2012
 "Ugly" - Jul. 22, 2012
 "Nasty Jobs" - Jul. 29, 2012
 "Weird Weddings" - Aug. 5, 2012
 "Strange Passions" - Aug. 19, 2012
 "U.S. of Alcohol" - Sept. 2, 2012
 "Extreme Bodies" - Sept. 23, 2012
 "Changing Sex" - Sept. 30, 2012
 "Weird Collections" - Oct. 2, 2012
 "Private Passions" - Oct. 9, 2012
 "Old Enough?" - Oct. 16, 2012
 "Strange Syndromes" - Oct. 23, 2012
 "Bizarre Burials" - Oct. 30, 2012
 "Devils and Demons" - Nov. 19, 2012

Season 10
This "season" consists of episodes from a spin-off series: "Taboo USA".

 "Secret Passions" - Jun. 04, 2013
 "Strange Bonds" - Jun. 11, 2013
 "Odd Jobs" - Jun. 18, 2013
 "Forever Young" - Jun. 25, 2013
 "Strange Obsessions" - Jul. 02, 2013
 "Inked, Pierced & Hooked" - Jul. 09, 2013
 "Extreme Obesity" - Jul. 16, 2013
 "Strange Medicine" - Jul. 23, 2013
 "Body Shock" - Jul. 30, 2013
 "Home Strange Home" - Aug. 06, 2013
 "Strange Medicine" - Dec. 17, 2013

Specials

 The original Taboo pilot aired as a special in 2002.
 "Sex Swap" - 2007
 "Marked for Life" - March 2, 2008
 "Quest for Acceptance" - March 26, 2008
 "Ritualized" - Dec. 5, 2014
 "New Shades of Sex" - Dec. 5, 2014
 "Express Your Body" - Dec. 5, 2014

Featured individuals
 Miss Plus America, Steph DeWaegeneer; Ms. Plus America 2009, featured in the episode "Fat".
 The Lizardman, Erik Sprague, featured in the episode "Outcast".

References

External links
 
 

2002 American television series debuts
2014 American television series endings
2000s American documentary television series
2010s American documentary television series
Cultural anthropology
English-language television shows
National Geographic (American TV channel) original programming